Al Mohammad Moniruzzaman (born 25 October 1976) is a Bangladeshi cricketer who has played in two One Day Internationals in 2003. He is now an umpire and stood in matches in the 2016–17 National Cricket League in Bangladesh. He also standing as an on-field umpire in BPL matches since 2015 Bangladesh Premier League.

He was included in Bangladesh's ICC Emerging Panel and was considered to be on his way to making the elite programme. But, he left the profession of umpiring due to the concern of senior national players like Shakib Al Hasan and Mahmudullah showing dissent aggressively to umpire's decisions during 2021 Dhaka Premier Division Twenty20 Cricket League. He had officiated 13 matches in the tournament. While expressing his concern, he said, "I am concerned about the behaviour of the senior cricketers in this 2021 DPL. I think other players could also be influenced by seeing their behaviour. This situation could turn worse in future."
"Enough is enough for me and I don't want to do umpiring anymore,....I have some self-respect and want to live with it.", he told to Cricbuzz.

References

1976 births
Living people
Bangladesh One Day International cricketers
Bangladeshi cricketers
Bangladeshi cricket umpires
Barisal Division cricketers
Dhaka Division cricketers
People from Mymensingh